Anthem Kolkata is a Purbayan Chatterjee initiative. 
Anthem Kolkata titled Tomake Chai Bole Banchi scheduled to be launched in August 2013 is a first city anthem project of Kolkata, written by Srijato Bandopadhyay and Bickram Ghosh, tune being composed by Purbayan Chatterjee and the classical vocalists are Rashid Khan, Rupam Islam, Rupankar Bagchi) and Lopamudra Mitra. The anthem is being recorded in Bengali, Hindi and English languages. Once recorded the city of Kolkata will be the first in India to have its own anthem and will be among the world cities such as New York City and Paris that have their own anthem. Usha Uthup has sung the English lyrics. The Bengali and Hindi lyrics had been composed by Srijato where as percussionist Bickram Ghosh composed the English lyrics.

References

External links
 Images of Kolkata city anthem project launch

Kolkata in popular culture